Auriculella expansa was a species of tropical air-breathing land snails, terrestrial pulmonate gastropod mollusks. This species was endemic to the United States.

References

Auriculella
Extinct gastropods
Taxa named by William Harper Pease
Taxonomy articles created by Polbot
Gastropods described in 1868